Ludwikowo may refer to the following places:
Ludwikowo, Nakło County in Kuyavian-Pomeranian Voivodeship (north-central Poland)
Ludwikowo, Gmina Bytoń in Kuyavian-Pomeranian Voivodeship (north-central Poland)
Ludwikowo, Gmina Dobre in Kuyavian-Pomeranian Voivodeship (north-central Poland)
Ludwikowo, Płock County in Masovian Voivodeship (east-central Poland)
Ludwikowo, Płońsk County in Masovian Voivodeship (east-central Poland)
Ludwikowo, Gmina Czerwonak in Greater Poland Voivodeship (west-central Poland)
Ludwikowo, Gmina Mosina in Greater Poland Voivodeship (west-central Poland)
Ludwikowo, Szamotuły County in Greater Poland Voivodeship (west-central Poland)
Ludwikowo, Środa Wielkopolska County in Greater Poland Voivodeship (west-central Poland)
Ludwikowo, Śrem County in Greater Poland Voivodeship (west-central Poland)
Ludwikowo, Wągrowiec County in Greater Poland Voivodeship (west-central Poland)
Ludwikowo, Pomeranian Voivodeship (north Poland)